St Mary's Youth Football Club (usually just St Mary's) is a Northern Irish, intermediate football club based in Portadown, County Armagh, playing in Intermediate Division A of the Mid-Ulster Football League. The club was founded in 1959. Club colours are claret and sky blue.

The club participates in the Irish Cup.

References

External links
 nifootball.co.uk - (For fixtures, results and tables of all Northern Ireland amateur football leagues)
 

Association football clubs in Northern Ireland
Association football clubs in County Armagh
Mid-Ulster Football League clubs